Wills Neck is the highest summit on the Quantock Hills and one of the highest points in Somerset, England. Although only  1261 ft (384 m) high, it qualifies as one of England's Marilyns.

The name 'Wills Neck' is derived from the Saxon word for 'stranger' or 'foreigner'. It relates to a local tribe the Wealas which according to legend fought the Romans at the site.

On a clear day it is possible to see Dartmoor, Exmoor, the Brecon Beacons, the Mendips and Blackdown Hills.  It is sometimes even possible to see Pilsdon Pen, the second highest point in Dorset, the highest, Lewesdon Hill, is also visible.

The hill is formed from Hangman Grits laid down during the Devonian a geologic period of the Paleozoic Era spanning from the end of the Silurian Period, about  Mya (million years ago), to the beginning of the Carboniferous Period.

Wills Neck was surveyed by schoolboys from Clifton College from 1922 and 1945, led by teacher William Cornish Badcock. They built a cairn at the highest point which has now been replaced, on exactly the same spot, by a modern Trig point.

A beer brewed by the Quantock Brewery  has been named Wills Neck after the hill.

References 

Hills of Somerset
Marilyns of England